Mordellistena liturata is a beetle in the genus Mordellistena of the family Mordellidae. It was described in 1845 by Frederick Valentine Melsheimer.

References

liturata
Beetles described in 1845